Saint-Armel is the name of several communes in France:

Saint-Armel, in the Ille-et-Vilaine department
Saint-Armel, in the Morbihan department

See also
Saint Armel